Downs Field is a baseball venue located in Austin, Texas and the home of the Huston–Tillotson University Rams baseball team. Downs Field was once the home of the Austin Black Senators and also was the home ballpark of Samuel Huston College before it combined with Tillotson College as one unified college in 1952. Some notable names that have taken the field at Downs Field were Satchel Paige, Willie Wells, Smokey Joe Williams, Willie Mays, and Buck O'Neil.

References

Baseball venues in Greater Austin
Baseball venues in Texas